The White Black Sheep is a 1926 American silent drama film produced by Inspiration Pictures and distributed by First National. it was directed by Sidney Olcott with Richard Barthelmess and Patsy Ruth Miller in the lead roles.

Cast

Production
The White Black Sheep was shot in First National studios in Burbank, California.

External links

 The White Black Sheep website dedicated to Sidney Olcott

1926 films
American silent feature films
Films directed by Sidney Olcott
1926 romantic drama films
American romantic drama films
American black-and-white films
Films shot in Burbank, California
1920s American films
Silent romantic drama films
Silent American drama films